Arnold J. Mandell is an American neuroscientist and psychiatrist. Born in 1934, in Chicago, Illinois, he received his B.A. from Stanford University in 1954 and his M.D. from Tulane University in 1958.  Founding chairman in 1969 of the Department of Psychiatry at the University of California, San Diego,
 he was, at the time of his appointment, the youngest physician ever appointed as a chairman of a medical school psychiatry program in the U.S.  An early biological psychiatrist, the department was the first in the U.S. to be biologically oriented.  After leaving UCSD, he has been involved in studying the basic science  and applied mathematics of brain activity and behavior.

He is the director of research of the Cielo Institute.,  a clinical professor of psychiatry at Emory University., a research professor of health and wellness at University of North Carolina, Asheville, professor of psychiatry at University of California, San Diego, visiting scientist at the Core MEG Lab at the National Institutes of Health, and a senior research associate at Scripps Research Institute.

Awards
 1984 MacArthur Fellows Program
 A.E. Bennett Research Prize of the Society for Biological Psychiatry
 1994 Senior Humboldt Prize Fellowship in Dynamical Systems, Bremen University
 Foundations Fund Research Prize of the American Psychiatric Association
 Johananoff International Prize Fellow in Psychopharmacology (Mario Negri Institute, Milan, Italy).

Partial list of works
 Psychochemical Research in Man: Methods, Strategy, and Theory (with Mary P. Mandell) (1969) 
 New Concepts in Neurotransmitter Regulation (1973) 
 The Nightmare Season (1976) 
 Coming of Middle Age: A Journey (1977) 
 Perspectives in biological dynamics and theoretical medicine (with Stephen H Koslow, Michael F. Shlesinger) (1987) 
"Psychoanalysis and Psychopharmachology", in Modern Psychoanalysis: New Directions and Perspectives, Editor	Judd Marmor, Transaction Publishers, 1995, 
 The Nearness of Grace:  A Personal Science Of Spiritual Transformation (2005)

References

American neuroscientists
Living people
University of California, San Diego faculty
Emory University faculty
MacArthur Fellows
Year of birth missing (living people)